
Joachim Witthöft (23 September 1887 – 7 July 1966) was a German general during World War II.  He was a recipient of the Knight's Cross of the Iron Cross. Witthöft commanded Army Group South Rear Area (as Army Group B) during the 1942 Wehrmacht's campaign.

Like other Army Group Rear Areas, the territories under Witthöft's control were the sites of mass murder during the Holocaust and other crimes against humanity targeting the civilian population. Rear Area commanders operated in parallel, and in cooperation, with the Higher SS and Police Leaders appointed by the head of the SS, Heinrich Himmler, for each of the army group's rear areas. In the words of historian Michael Parrish, these army commanders "presided over an empire of terror and brutality".

Awards and decorations

 Knight's Cross of the Iron Cross on 14 December 1941 as Generalleutnant and commander of the 86th Infantry Division

References

Citations

Bibliography

 

 

1887 births
1966 deaths
Generals of Infantry (Wehrmacht)
Prussian Army personnel
German Army personnel of World War I
Recipients of the clasp to the Iron Cross, 1st class
Recipients of the Knight's Cross of the Iron Cross
German prisoners of war in World War II held by the United Kingdom
People from Kwidzyn
People from West Prussia
German police officers
Nazi war criminals
German Army generals of World War II